Bethel may refer to the following places in the U.S. state of Oklahoma:

 Bethel, Comanche County, Oklahoma, an unincorporated community
 Bethel, Grant County, Oklahoma, the site of a post office from March 12, 1895, until November 2, 1895
 Bethel, McCurtain County, Oklahoma, a rural unincorporated community
 Bethel Acres, Oklahoma, a town in Pottawatomie County